David Robert (born 1969) is a French former professional footballer who played as a midfielder. In his career, he played for INF Vichy, Valenciennes, Sochaux, and Le Havre.

References 

1969 births
Living people
People from Luxeuil-les-Bains
Sportspeople from Haute-Saône
French footballers
Association football midfielders
INF Vichy players
Valenciennes FC players
FC Sochaux-Montbéliard players
Le Havre AC players
French Division 3 (1971–1993) players
Ligue 2 players
Ligue 1 players
Championnat National 2 players
Footballers from Bourgogne-Franche-Comté